Ryohei Kanokogi was an early pioneer for judo in the United States.

Personal life
Ryohei is the grandson of a samurai.  He had two children with Rusty Kanokogi, plus a son, Christopher, from a previous marriage.

Martial arts career
Ryohei was also the high school Judo champion of Japan. Ryohei Kanokogi was former all-weights judo champion of southeastern Japan.   He was also a champion in karate. Ryohei later attended Nichidai University as a member of the judo team.  He was featured in a number of Sports Illustrated articles including Confessions Of A Judo Roll-Out.

Martial arts coaching career
He was known for his courtesy and expected good behavior from his students.  Along with his wife Rusty Kanokogi, he was influential in the establishment of women's judo.    Ryohei was the judo coach for Japan during the  Judo at the 1964 Summer Olympics, and later immigrated to the United States with the help of Jerome Mackey.   While in New York, he initially taught at Judo, Inc, where he and his wife were featured in an article in Sports Illustrated.   He served as a coach for Olympic Bronze Medalist Allen Coage. Later, Ryohei taught at the U.S. Merchant Marine Academy.  He later served as a US Olympic Team judo coach.

Media
Kanokogi has appeared in commercials for Samsonite luggage and the after shave Hai Karate.

The Goodbye Girl (1977) - Japanese Salesman 

Carlito's Way (1993) - Japanese Club Patron

References

American sportspeople of Japanese descent
People from Tokyo
Japanese emigrants to the United States
Japanese male judoka
American male judoka